Wang Zheng (born 14 December 1987) is a Chinese hammer thrower. Her personal best throw is 77.68 metres, achieved on 29 March 2014 in Chengdu, which was an Asian record.

She finished second at the 2017 World Championships as well as ninth at the 2006 World Junior Championships. She competed at the 2008 Olympic Games without reaching the final round.

She won the silver medal in women's hammer throw at the 2020 Summer Olympics in Tokyo on 3 August 2021 with her season's best of 77.03 metres.

International competitions

References

External links

Team China 2008

1987 births
Living people
Athletes from Shanxi
Chinese female hammer throwers
Olympic athletes of China
Athletes (track and field) at the 2008 Summer Olympics
Athletes (track and field) at the 2016 Summer Olympics
Athletes (track and field) at the 2020 Summer Olympics
Olympic silver medalists for China
Medalists at the 2020 Summer Olympics
Asian Games medalists in athletics (track and field)
Athletes (track and field) at the 2010 Asian Games
Athletes (track and field) at the 2014 Asian Games
Athletes (track and field) at the 2018 Asian Games
World Athletics Championships athletes for China
World Athletics Championships medalists
Asian Games silver medalists for China
Medalists at the 2010 Asian Games
Medalists at the 2014 Asian Games
Medalists at the 2018 Asian Games
Sportspeople from Xi'an
Asian Athletics Championships winners
Olympic silver medalists in athletics (track and field)